Georgios Kalaitzakis (Greek: Γιώργος Καλαϊτζάκης  ; born January 2, 1999) is a Greek professional basketball player for Panathinaikos of the Greek Basket League and the EuroLeague. He can primarily play at the small forward position. As a teenager, Kalaitzakis used to be regarded as one of the top young European prospects in his age range.

Professional career

Panathinaikos (2016–2019) 
After playing with the junior youth clubs of Aris, Kalaitzakis began his professional career in 2016, with the Greek club Panathinaikos. With Panathinaikos, he won the Greek Cup title in 2016, 2017, and 2019, and also the Greek League championship, in 2017, 2018, and 2019.

In March 2018, Kalaitzakis announced his intention to declare for the 2018 NBA draft. He later withdrew from the draft before the draft's withdrawal deadline.

Nevėžis (2019–2020) 
On August 28, 2019, Kalaitzakis signed with Nevėžis Kėdainiai of the Lithuanian Basketball League, on a loan deal from Panathinaikos. In 23 games played in the Lithuanian League's 2019–20 season, he averaged 12.2 points, 4.3 rebounds, 2.3 assists, and 1.0 steals per game, in 28.7 minutes per game.

Return to Panathinaikos (2020–2021) 
In April 2020, Kalaitzakis declared for the 2020 NBA draft. However, he withdrew before the draft took place. On August 11, 2020, he re-signed with Panathinaikos, through the end of the 2021–22 season. With Panathinaikos, he won both the 2020–21 Greek Cup title, and the 2020–21 Greek League season championship.

Milwaukee Bucks (2021)
Kalaitzakis was selected by the NBA's Indiana Pacers, with the 60th overall pick of the 2021 NBA draft. His draft rights were then traded to the Milwaukee Bucks, along with the draft rights of the 54th pick, Sandro Mamukelashvili, and two second round draft picks, for Isaiah Todd. Kalaitzakis' contract with the Greek Basket League club Panathinaikos had a buyout amount of $300,000, which was paid by the Bucks. On August 11, 2021, the Milwaukee Bucks announced that they had signed with Kalaitzakis. Kalaitzakis made his debut in the NBA on October 19, 2021, coming-off from bench with two rebounds in a 127–104 win over the Brooklyn Nets. On December 3, he was waived by the Bucks after nine appearances.

Oklahoma City Thunder / Blue (2021–2022)
On December 30, 2021, Kalaitzakis was claimed off waivers by the Oklahoma City Blue of the NBA G League
where he played in 31 regular season games and averaged 10.1 points, 3.9 rebounds and 2.1 assists in 19.6 minutes per game. On April 5, 2022, he signed with the Oklahoma City Thunder for the rest of the season. Kalaitzakis played four games for the Thunder, averaging 41.5 minutes and 17.5 points per game.

Third stint with Panathinaikos (2022–present) 
On July 25, 2022, Kalaitzakis signed a two-year contract with Panathinaikos, returning to Greece and reuniting with his twin brother Panos.

National team career
Kalaitzakis was a member of the junior national teams of Greece. With Greece's junior national teams, he played at the 2015 FIBA Europe Under-16 Championship, the 2016 FIBA Europe Under-18 Championship, and the 2017 FIBA Europe Under-18 Championship. He also played at the 2018 FIBA Europe Under-20 Championship, and the 2019 FIBA Europe Under-20 Championship, which he led in scoring, with an average of 19.7 points per game.

Career statistics

NBA

|-
| style="text-align:left;" rowspan=2| 2021–22
| style="text-align:left;"| Milwaukee
| 9 || 0 || 5.3 || .455 || .500 || .444 || .9 || .0 || .1 || .1 || 1.8
|-
| style="text-align:left;"| Oklahoma City
| 4 || 4 || 41.4 || .464 || .364 || .476 || 3.3 || 3.0 || 2.5 || .3 || '''17.5
|- class="sortbottom"
| style="text-align:center;" colspan="2"| Career
| 13 || 4 || 16.4 || .463 || .385 || .467 || 1.6 || .9 || .8 || .2 || 6.6

Personal life
Kalaitzakis' twin brother Panos is a professional basketball player and has been Georgios' teammate in both the Lithuanian club Nevėžis Kėdainiai as well as Panathinaikos. Their younger sibling Alexandros (born 2003) also plays basketball professionally.

References

External links
Proballers.com Profile
FIBA.com Profile
Euroleague.net Profile
Eurobasket.com Profile
Greek Basket League Profile 
Lithuanian Basketball League Profile
Panathinaikos B.C. Profile

1999 births
Living people
BC Nevėžis players
Greek Basket League players
Greek expatriate basketball people in the United States
Greek men's basketball players
Indiana Pacers draft picks
Milwaukee Bucks players
National Basketball Association players from Greece
Oklahoma City Blue players
Oklahoma City Thunder players
Panathinaikos B.C. players
Small forwards
Sportspeople from Heraklion
Greek twins
Wisconsin Herd players